Tai Po Hospital, located in Tai Po, Hong Kong, provides assessment, extended-care and integrated rehabilitation services to elderly, chronically-ill and acute psychiatric patients. It is also one of three designated spinal cord injury rehabilitation centres in Hong Kong.

The hospital began providing medical services in 1998.

Facilities
As of March 2021, the hospital has a total of 1,026 beds, of which 433 are general (acute and convalescent) beds, 233 infirmary beds and 360 psychiatric beds. There are also much open space for exercise and physical activities for patients.

References

External links

Hospitals in Hong Kong
Hospitals established in 1998
1998 establishments in Hong Kong